Kurt Dossin (March 28, 1913 – April 26, 2004) was a German field handball player who competed in the 1936 Summer Olympics. He played two matches for the German team, which won the gold medal.

References

1913 births
2004 deaths
German male handball players
Olympic handball players of Germany
Field handball players at the 1936 Summer Olympics
Olympic gold medalists for Germany
Olympic medalists in handball
Medalists at the 1936 Summer Olympics